Stob Coir' an Albannaich (1,044 m) is a mountain in the Grampian Mountains of Scotland. It lies on the border of Argyll and Bute and the Highlands area, south of Glen Etive.

The mountain makes for a fine traverse. The closest village is Taynuilt to the south.

References

Mountains and hills of Highland (council area)
Mountains and hills of Argyll and Bute
Marilyns of Scotland
Munros